Ronald Victor Black (10 May 1908 – 3 October 1983) was an Australian rules footballer who played with Hawthorn in the Victorian Football League (VFL).

Early life
The son of Henry John Black (1862-1936) and Jane Ann Black (1869-1943), nee Armstrong, Ronald Victor Black was born at Box Hill in Victoria on 10 May 1908.

He was educated at Box Hill Grammar School.

Football
In the Round 18 match against Richmond in 1927 at Punt Road, Black broke his leg when he collided with the boundary fence and missed the 1928 VFL football season while recovering from the fracture.

Black played with Camberwell Football Club in 1930.

Black won the 1932 and 1935 Ovens and King Football League's best and fairest award, the Charles Butler Medal, when playing for the Whorouly Football Club. He was also runner up in the same award in 1936.

Notes

External links 

1929 - Hawthorn FC - team photo
Coming of Age: Ron Black

1908 births
1983 deaths
Hawthorn Football Club players
Camberwell Football Club players
Australian rules footballers from Melbourne
People from Box Hill, Victoria